A. erectum may refer to:

 Angraecum erectum, an orchid species in the genus Angraecum found in tropical Africa
 Asplenium erectum, a synonym for Asplenium aequibasis, a fern species endemic to Saint Helena

See also
 Erectum (disambiguation)